Phylladiorhynchus is a genus of squat lobsters in the family Galatheidae, containing the following species:
 Phylladiorhynchus bengalensis Tirmizi & Javed, 1980
 Phylladiorhynchus ikedai (Miyake & Baba, 1965)
 Phylladiorhynchus integrirostris (Dana, 1852)
 Phylladiorhynchus nudus Macpherson, 2008
 Phylladiorhynchus pusillus (Henderson, 1885)

References

Squat lobsters